The 2013 UNCAF U-16 Tournament was the 5th UNCAF U-16 Tournament, a biennial international football tournament contested by men's under-16 national teams.  Organized by UNCAF, the tournament took place in Belize between 18 and 22 November 2013.

The matches were played at FFB Stadium.  Six Central American teams took part of the tournament, playing each other in a round-robin format.  Panama didn't send a representation.  Guatemala won the tournament.

Venue

Final standings

Results

Goalscorers
3 goals:

  Luis Hernández
  Anderson Treminio

2 goals:

  José Gómez
  Abel Lemus
  Rogi Solórzano
  Esteban García
  Foslyn Grant
  Gerald Contreras

1 goal:

  Brandon de León
  José Meléndez
  Albín Sifontes
  Brandon Cante
  José Canelas
  Kevin Martínez
  Gabriel Ortiz
  Carlos Méndez
  Armando Aroche
  Álvaro Velásquez
  Jeyson Flores
  Jonathan Martínez
  Ariagner Smith
  Carlos Menéndez
  José Alvarado
  Marvin Márquez
  Shaw Manley
  Sergio Ramírez

References

External links
UNCAF Official Website

2013
2013 in youth association football
2013–14 in Belizean football
2013